Tsurtil is a rural locality (a selo) in Khuchninsky Selsoviet, Tabasaransky District, Republic of Dagestan, Russia. The population was 344 as of 2010. There are 2 streets.

Geography 
Tsurtil is located 17 km south of Khuchni (the district's administrative centre) by road. Akka is the nearest rural locality.

References 

Rural localities in Tabasaransky District